7 (Training) Regiment Army Air Corps is a regiment of the British Army and is part of the Joint Helicopter Command. The regiment is responsible for providing all of the flight training of Army Air Corps (AAC) pilots. The regiment is based at the Army Aviation Centre at Middle Wallop.

Structure
The regiment consists of three squadrons and one flight:

No. 671 Squadron AAC conducts Conversion to Type training on the Gazelle and Bell 212 helicopter for graduates of the Operational Training Phase and students on the Aviation Crewman course.
No. 673 Squadron AAC conducts Conversion to Type training on the Apache attack helicopter for both newly qualified and experienced Army pilots.
No. 25 Flight AAC based at Nanyuki in Kenya is responsible for providing 24/7 medical evacuation and range clearances operating Bell 212 helicopters for the British Army Training Unit Kenya.

History
7 Army Aviation Regiment was formed  1969 at Airfield Camp, Netheravon. In 1971, the regiment was renamed to 7 Regiment Army Aviation Corps. During its time as a regular unit, the following squadrons and flights were part of the regiment: 651 Squadron, 658 Squadron, 2 Flight and 8 Flight. 658 Squadron had reformed  1982. The Agusta A109A helicopter had entered service with 8 Flight in 1984. 666 (V) Squadron had become part of the regiment in 1986.

In April 1995, the regiment re-roled as a volunteer unit 7 Regiment AAC (V). The regiment consisted of 666 Squadron (V), 658 Squadron (V), 3 Flight (V) at RAF Turnhouse (later RAF Leuchars) and 6 Flight (V) based at Shawbury.

On 1 April 2009, the regiment re-roled as a regular training unit 7 (Training) Regiment AAC based at Middle Wallop as part of the School of Army Aviation. On 1 August 2009, the school was renamed as the Army Aviation Centre. The regiment consisted of 670 Squadron, 671 Squadron and 673 Squadron.

References

External links
Official website

Army Air Corps regiments
Training regiments of the British Army
Army flying training units and formations
Military units and formations established in 1969